Blair Parry-Okeden (born 1950) is an American-born Australian billionaire heiress and philanthropist. According to Forbes Asia, she was Australia's richest person by net worth in 2016. Parry-Okeden's wealth derives from Cox Enterprises.

Early life
Parry-Okeden was born in 1950 in Honolulu, Hawaii, and educated there at La Pietra: Hawaii School for Girls, which was founded by her mother, Barbara Cox Anthony. She then studied to become a teacher.

Parry-Okeden's grandfather James M. Cox founded the privately held media company Cox Enterprises. Her brother James C. Kennedy is the chairman, and her aunt, Anne Cox Chambers, is the largest shareholder and sits on the board. In 2007, following the death of her mother, Parry-Okeden inherited 25% of Cox Enterprises. She presently has no role at the company.

Wealth
Parry-Okeden first came to prominence in Australia in March 2009 when Forbes Asia assessed her net worth at 7.0 billion. In January 2016, her net worth was assessed by Forbes at 9.8 billion; and in 2019 her wealth was estimated at 9.3 billion; however, she no longer appeared on the list of Australians by net worth due to her US citizenship. Her philanthropic interests include the Shore School, the University of Hawaii's Center on Aging, the Scone Grammar School, and Strathearn Village, a non-profit aged-care centre.

Personal life
Parry-Okeden has two sons, Andrew and Henry, with her ex-husband Simon Parry-Okeden. She lives in Australia, having moved there from the US in the 1970s to live with her husband at the time.

Published works

Notes
 Down by the gate is a children's book about an advertisement that Mother Goose placed in a newspaper.

References

1950 births
American billionaires
American expatriates in Australia
Cox family
Female billionaires
Living people
People from Hawaii